Dimandougou (also known as Kouadianinabango) is a town in eastern Ivory Coast. It is a sub-prefecture of Sandégué Department in Gontougo Region, Zanzan District.

Dimandougou was a commune until March 2012, when it became one of 1126 communes nationwide that were abolished.

In 2014, the population of the sub-prefecture of Dimandougou was 9,280.

Villages
The five villages of the sub-prefecture of Dimandougou and their population in 2014 are:
 Diezué (1 673)
 Dimandougou (2 876)
 Gbangourman (607)
 Logotan (678)
 Yangbesso (1 325)

Notes

Sub-prefectures of Gontougo
Former communes of Ivory Coast